The following is a list of the MTV Europe Music Award winners and nominees for Best Greater China Act.

Winners and nominees

2010s

2020s

Mainland China and Hong Kong Act
Awards established in 2013